The tip-speed ratio, λ, or TSR for wind turbines is the ratio between the tangential speed of the tip of a blade and the actual speed of the wind, . The tip-speed ratio is related to efficiency, with the optimum varying with blade design. Higher tip speeds result in higher noise levels and require stronger blades due to larger centrifugal forces.

 

The tip speed of the blade can be calculated as  times R, where  is the rotational speed of the rotor in radians/second, and R is the rotor radius in metres. Therefore, we can also write:

 
where  is the wind speed in metres/second at the height of the blade hub.

Cp–λ curves 
The power coefficient,  is a quantity that expresses what fraction of the power in the wind is being extracted by the wind turbine. It is generally assumed to be a function of both tip-speed ratio and pitch angle. Below is a plot of the variation of the power coefficient with variations in the tip-speed ratio when the pitch is held constant:

The case for variable speed wind turbines 
Originally, wind turbines were fixed speed. This has the benefit that the rotor speed in the generator is constant, thus the frequency of the AC voltage is fixed. This allows the wind turbine to be directly connected to a transmission system. However, from the figure above, we can see that the power coefficient is a function of the tip-speed ratio. By extension, the efficiency of the wind turbine is a function of the tip-speed ratio.

This means that as the wind speed changes, the rotor speed must change to such that . A wind turbine with a variable rotor speed is called a variable speed wind turbine. This can be seen in the following equation:

where  is the rotor angular speed,  is the frequency of the AC voltage generated in the stator windings,  is the number of poles in the generator inside the nacelle. That is, direct connection to a transmission system for a variable speed is not permissible. What is required is a power converter which converts the signal generated by the turbine generator into DC and then converts that signal to an AC signal with the grid/transmission system frequency.

The case against variable speed wind turbines 
As already mentioned, variable speed wind turbines cannot be directly connected to a transmission system. One of the drawbacks of this is that the inertia of the transmission system is reduced as more variable speed wind turbines are put online. This can result in more significant drops in the transmission system's voltage frequency in the event of the loss of a generating unit. Furthermore, variable speed wind turbines require power electronics, which increases the complexity of the turbine and introduces new sources of failures. It has also been suggested that additional energy capture achieved by comparing a variable speed wind turbine to a fixed speed wind turbine is approximately 2%.

References

Wind turbines
Engineering ratios